Annone di Brianza is a commune in the Province of Lecco, Lombardy, Italy, located about  northeast of Milan and about  southwest of Lecco. The Lago di Annone is located on its borders.

Annone di Brianza borders the following municipalities: Bosisio Parini, Cesana Brianza, Civate, Galbiate, Molteno, Oggiono, Suello.

References

External links
 Official website

Cities and towns in Lombardy